Şiir Eloğlu (born 6 December 1965, in Istanbul, Turkey) is a Turkish-German actress who lives and works in Berlin and Cologne.

Life 
Eloğlu moved from Istanbul to Cologne as a four year old. The name "Şiir" is derived from her father, Metin Eloğlu (1927–1985), a painter and lyricist, who was awarded with important literature awards in the 1960s and 1970s.

After graduating from high school in Cologne, Eloğlu studied for four years at the Hochschule für Musik Saar in Saarbrücken. Her first engagements then took her to theatres in Erlangen, Oberhausen, and Cologne.

Eloğlu became known to a wider audience between 1993 and 1996 by her role of young assistant doctor Dr. Nesrin Ergün in the RTL series Stadtklinik.

At the end of 1997, she moved to Berlin. She followed TV and cinema productions as well as theater engagements, among others at the Düsseldorfer Schauspielhaus, where she acted in Antigone and Seven Against Thebes.

Her first international film production was the Swiss film 180° – Wenn deine Welt plötzlich Kopf steht, which was filmed by director Cihan Inan in Zürich. The international cast included Sophie Rois, Christopher Buchholz, Sabine Timoteo, and Michael Neuenschwander. The film ran at festivals in Antalya, Saarbrücken, Sudbury, and Marrakesh, as well as in the Spanish Ourense, where it received an award for Best Screenplay.

She was featured in Almanya - Welcome to Germany, directed by Yasemin Şamdereli, as Leyla Yılmaz. The film was awarded the Deutscher Filmpreis.

From 2014 to 2015, she played the architect Suna Kaya in the soap opera Lindenstraße.

Filmography 
 1991: 
 1992: Tatort – Falsche Liebe (TV series)
 1992–1996: Stadtklinik (TV series)
 1997: : Kinderärztin Leah – Auf der Flucht (TV series)
 1998: Tatort – In der Falle (TV series)
 1998: Alphateam – Die Lebensretter im OP (TV series)
 1998: 
 2004: Der Dicke (TV series)
 2005–2006: Die Anrheiner (TV series)
 2006–2011: Der Dicke (TV series)
 2007: Notruf Hafenkante (TV series)
 2008: 
 2008: 
 2009: Danni Lowinski (TV series)
 Seit 2010: Gute Zeiten, schlechte Zeiten (TV series)
 2010: 180° – Wenn deine Welt plötzlich Kopf steht
 2010: Tatort – Leben gegen Leben (TV series)
 2011: Der Verdacht (TV film)
 2011: Almanya: Welcome to Germany
 2011: 
 2011: Tatort – Im Abseits
 2013: Tatort – Machtlos
 2013: 5 Jahre Leben
 2013: Sitting Next To Zoe
 2013: 
 2014: Kückückskind
 2014–2015: Lindenstraße (TV series)
 2015: Die Kanzlei (TV series)
 2015: Der Kriminalist – Im Namen des Vaters
 2016: Goster
 2017: Aus dem Nichts
 2017: Tehran Taboo
 2018: Heldt
 2019: Servus, Schwiegersohn!
 2020: Matzo, kebab and sauerkraut
 2020–2021: Bettys Diagnose
 2021: Servus, mother-in-law!

Literature 
 Alexandra Eul: Şiir Eloğlu. Die Komische. In: Emma, September/Oktober 2014, S. 14–15.

External links 
Şiir Eloğlu Offizielle Homepage

1965 births
Living people
German actresses
Actresses from Istanbul
Turkish emigrants to Germany
German people of Turkish descent